Petrophassa, commonly known as the rock pigeons, is a small genus of doves in the family Columbidae native to Australia, and similar to bronzewing pigeons.

The genus was introduced in 1841 by the English ornithologist and bird artist John Gould with the white-quilled rock pigeon (Petrophassa albipennis) as the type species. The genus name is a portmanteau of the Ancient Greek words petros, meaning "rock", and phassa, meaning "pigeon".

The genus contains two species:
 Chestnut-quilled rock pigeon, P. rufipennis
 White-quilled rock pigeon, P. albipennis

They are not closely related to Columba livia, the rock dove (also called rock pigeon), a species which includes the domestic and feral pigeons as well as the wild species native to Europe, North Africa and Asia.

References

 
Bird genera